List of The Worst Witch episodes may refer to one of the following:

 List of The Worst Witch (1998 TV series) episodes
 List of The Worst Witch (2017 TV series) episodes